Yuen Foong Khong (born 1956) is the Li Ka Shing Professor of Political Science at the Lee Kuan Yew School of Public Policy, National University of Singapore. He was previously Professor of International Relations at Nuffield College, University of Oxford. Prior to that, he was Associate Professor of Government at Harvard University. A cited expert whose highest cited paper is Analogies at War: Korea, Munich, Dien Bien Phu, and the Vietnam Decisions of 1965 at 894 times, according to GoogleScholar. Khong' research interests are in United States foreign policy, international relations theory, the international politics of the Asia Pacific region, and cognitive approaches to international relations.

He received his PhD (Political Science/International Relations) from Harvard University in 1987.

Selected publications
Analogies at War: Korea, Munich, Dien Bien Phu, and the Vietnam Decisions of 1965 (Princeton University Press, 1992; 6th printing 2006).
With Neil MacFarlane, The United Nations and Human Security: A Critical History (Indiana University Press, 2006).
With David Malone (co-ed.) Unilateralism and U.S. Foreign Policy: International Perspectives(New York: Lynn Reiner, 2003).
With Charles Kupchan, Emmauel Adler, and Jean Marc Coicaud, Power in Transition: The Peaceful Change of International Order (Tokyo: United Nations University Press, 2001)

References 

1956 births
Living people
Fellows of Nuffield College, Oxford
Academics of the University of Oxford
Malaysian political scientists
Harvard University faculty
Harvard University alumni